Damburneya cufodontisii is a species of plant in the family Lauraceae. It is found in Costa Rica, Nicaragua, and Panama.

References

cufodontisii
Flora of Costa Rica
Flora of Nicaragua
Flora of Panama
Taxonomy articles created by Polbot